The Louisville Raiders were a team in the United Football League from 1960 through 1962.  The team played their home games at Fairgrounds Stadium in Louisville, Kentucky.  The Raiders went 4–6 in 1961 and 4–7–1 in 1962.

See also
 Sports in Louisville, Kentucky

References

External links
 Louisville Raiders at Pro Football Archives

American football teams in Kentucky
Defunct sports teams in Louisville, Kentucky
United Football League (1961–1964) teams
American football teams established in 1960
American football teams disestablished in 1962
1960 establishments in Kentucky
1962 disestablishments in Kentucky